Horse people may refer to

Equestrians ("people" uncountable)
Ethnographically, ("people" countable; mostly dated, also mounted people)
Eurasian nomads
Plains Indians
Borana Oromo people
Songhai people

See also
 Horseman (disambiguation)
 Horse (disambiguation)